Sardār-e Īravānī was the title of Hossein Khan Sardar Qajar (1740–1830) and his brother Hasan Khan Qajar, the last governor of Erivan (Yerevan) 1807–28. This title was also used by Mohammad Hassan Khan Sardari Iravani, the son of Mohammad Khan Iravani, the preceding Khan of Erivan. He was the ancestor of family Sardari Iravani, an old Qajar family.

See also
 Iravani (surname)
 List of famous ab anbars of Qazvin

References

External links
 Official Website of the family Sardari Iravani

Qajar dynasty
History of Yerevan
Erivan Khanate